TUN or tun may refer to:

Biology
 Tun shells, large sea snails of the family Tonnidae
 Tun, a tardigrade in its cryptobiotic state
 Tun or Toon,  common name for trees of the genus Toona

Places
 Tun, Sweden, a locality in Västra Götaland County
 Tūn or Toon, the former name of Ferdows, a city in Iran
 Touro University Nevada, a private university in Henderson, Nevada, United States
 Tunisia, ISO 3166-1 alpha-3 country code
 Tunis–Carthage International Airport, (IATA airport code: TUN)
 Old English meaning town. Often used as a suffix in its Romanised form  (~ton) e.g.: Southampton

Measurement and time
 Tun (Maya calendar), a unit of 360 days on the Maya calendar
 Tun (unit), an antiquated measurement of liquid

Science and technology
 TUN/TAP, a computer network device driver
 TUN (product standard), Danish building materials numbering system

Other uses
 Brilliance Tun, a 2014–2015 Chinese city car
 Tun, an honorific Malay title
 Tun, a type of cask (barrel) with a capacity of 252 wine gallons (954 litres)
 Lauter tun, a vessel used in brewing
 Mash tun, a vessel used in brewing

See also
 Ton (disambiguation)